The Cal Ripken Collegiate Baseball League (CRCBL) is a collegiate summer baseball league located in the Washington, D.C., and Baltimore, Maryland, metropolitan areas. The CRCBL is a member of the National Alliance of College Summer Baseball (NACSB).

History

Founded in 2005, the league was named for Cal Ripken, Sr. (1935-1999), a longtime player and manager in the Baltimore Orioles system. It is not associated with the Cal Ripken, Sr. Foundation. In 2009, the league removed the "Sr." to also honor Cal Ripken Jr.

The league's founding teams were the Bethesda Big Train, College Park Bombers, Maryland Redbirds, Rockville Express, Silver Spring-Takoma Thunderbolts, and Youse's Maryland Orioles. The Herndon Braves joined in 2007 and the Alexandria Aces in 2008, expanding the league into Northern Virginia. Before the 2010 season, the College Park Bombers left the league and the Southern Maryland Nationals, formerly the Southern Maryland Cardinals, joined. The Maryland Redbirds changed their name to the Baltimore Redbirds. In 2011, the Vienna River Dogs became the ninth team in the league and the third in Northern Virginia. The league expanded into Washington, D.C., when the D.C. Grays joined for the 2012 season. In 2013, the Baltimore Pressman Cardinals and the Gaithersburg Giants joined the League. In 2014, the Southern Maryland Nationals shut down and the Cardinals were replaced by the Baltimore Dodgers. Youse's Maryland Orioles left after the season. In 2015, the League changed to a two-division format with a playoff.  After the 2018 season, the Baltimore Redbirds, Rockville Express, Baltimore Dodgers, and Loudoun Riverdogs left the League. The Olney Cropdusters jointed the League in 2022.

In 2011, Perfect Game USA ranked the Bethesda Big Train the best team in summer baseball.

Showcase games

Mid-Atlantic Classic 
On July 15, 2009, teams of all-stars from the CRCBL and the Valley Baseball League, a collegiate wooden-bat league based in Virginia, met to play a game dubbed the Mid-Atlantic Classic in Waldorf, Maryland. The Ripken League prevailed, 2–1. A planned 2010 rematch was rained out. On July 11, 2011, the leagues held the second Mid-Atlantic Classic at Eagle Field at Veterans Memorial Stadium in Harrisonburg, Virginia. The Ripken League won again, 6–3.

Southern Collegiate Showcase 
In 2017, 2018, and 2019, the CRCBL sent all-star teams to North Carolina to participate in the Southern Collegiate Prospect Showcase against teams from the Florida Collegiate Summer League, the Southern Collegiate Baseball League, the Sunbelt Baseball League, and the Valley Baseball League.

International competition

Ripken League Goodwill Mission Trip to Cuba (2016) 

A team of Ripken League players traveled to Cuba after the 2016 season.  The team played three of Cuba's top teams in the week before the start of the Cuban National Series in some of Cuba's classic ballparks.  On August 3, the Ripken League team upset the 2015 champions of the Cuban major leagues.  The Ripken League team defeated the Pinar del Rio Vegueros, 3-2, at Estadio Capitan San Luis before a boisterous crowd of 400.  On August 4, the Ripken League team lost to the Matanzas Cocodrilos 6-2 at Estadio Victoria de Giron (Victory at the Bay of Pigs).  On August 5, Industriales defeated the Ripken League team 6-4 in a rain-shortened game in Havana's iconic Estadio Latinoamericano where the March 2016 exhibition game between the Tampa Bay Rays and the Cuban National Team had been played.  Brady Anderson and B.J. Surhoff, who played for the Baltimore Orioles in Cuba in 1999, coached the team along with Ripken League co-founder Dean Albany."

Friendship Games with Israel National Baseball Team (2021) 

As part of its exhibition series to prepare for the Olympics in Japan, the Israel National Baseball Team played three games against Ripken League competition in July 2021.  On July 16, Team Israel defeated a Ripken League all-star team made up of players from the Braves, Giants, and Grays at FNB Field on City Island in Harrisburg, Pennsylvania.  On July 18, Team Israel came from behind in the final inning to beat the Bethesda Big Train 8-7 before a standing-room-only crowd of 835 at Shirley Povich Field in Rockville, Maryland.  On July 19, a Ripken League all-star team of players from the Aces, Big Train, and Thunderbolts defeated Team Israel 9-3 at Leidos Field at Ripken Stadium in Aberdeen, Maryland.

Teams

Champions

Every championship series from 2009 to 2018 pitted the Redbirds against the Big Train.

MLB Draft

In 2007, CRCBL alumnus Joe Smith earned a spot on a major league roster with the New York Mets.

In May 2009, Brett Cecil, who pitched for the Thunderbolts in 2005, was called up by the Toronto Blue Jays, where he pitched for eight seasons. In 2013, he became the first Ripken League alum to play in an MLB All-Star game. In November 2016 he signed a 4-year, $30.5 million contract with the St. Louis Cardinals.

The 2008 MLB Draft saw 40 former or current players chosen. Some players drafted included former Big Train player Carlos Gutierrez, at 27th overall by the Minnesota Twins. Three other players got drafted in the first three rounds: former Big Train player Evan Frederickson, at 35th overall by the Milwaukee Brewers, and two former players from the Youse's Orioles, Derrik Gibson in the 2nd round by the Boston Red Sox, and L. J. Hoes in the 3rd round by the Baltimore Orioles.

In the 2009 MLB draft, 37 former Ripken Leaguers were chosen, with the highest being Ben Tootle in the 3rd round, by the Minnesota Twins.

In the 2010 MLB Draft, 31 former Ripken Leaguers were chosen, with the highest being Jarrett Parker in the 2nd round, by the San Francisco Giants.

In the 2011 MLB Draft, 33 former Ripken Leaguers were chosen, with the highest being Jed Bradley in the 1st round (15th overall), by the Milwaukee Brewers.

In the 2012 MLB Draft, 31 former Ripken Leaguers were chosen, with the highest being Kyle Zimmer in the 1st round (5th overall), by the Kansas City Royals.

In the 2013 MLB Draft, 22 former Ripken Leaguers were chosen, with the highest being Hunter Renfroe in the 1st round (13th overall), by the San Diego Padres.

In the 2014 MLB Draft, 26 former Ripken Leaguers were chosen, with the highest being Mark Zagunis in the 3rd round, by the Chicago Cubs.

In the 2015 MLB Draft, 32 former Ripken Leaguers were chosen, with the highest being Brandon Lowe in the 3rd round, by the Tampa Bay Rays.

In the 2017 MLB Draft, 42 former Ripken Leaguers were chosen, with the highest being Logan Warmoth in the 1st round (22nd overall), by the Toronto Blue Jays.

In the 2018 MLB Draft, 44 former Ripken Leaguers were chosen, with the highest being Logan Gilbert in the 1st round (14th overall), by the Seattle Mariners.

In the 2019 MLB Draft, 36 former Ripken Leaguers were chosen, with the highest being Logan Driscoll in the 2nd round (72nd overall), by the San Diego Padres.

In the 2020 MLB Draft, 6 former Ripken Leaguers were chosen, with the highest being Jordan Westburg in the 1st round (30th overall) by the Baltimore Orioles.

Noted alumni
Brett Cecil, 2005 Thunderbolts
Joe Smith, 2005 Express
Zach Clark, 2005 Thunderbolts
Brian Dozier, 2006 Big Train
Jarrett Parker, 2007 Braves
Cody Allen, 2008, 2010 Big Train
Chris Taylor, 2009 Braves
Matt Bowman, 2010-12 Big Train
Joe Mantiply, 2010 Big Train
Kyle Zimmer, 2010 Aces
Ryan Garton, 2011 Big Train
Hunter Renfroe, 2011-12 Big Train
Ty France, 2013 Big Train
Brandon Lowe, 2014 Big Train
Eric Brodkowitz, 2014-15 Giants
Nate Lowe, 2015 Riverdogs
Logan Gilbert, 2016 Big Train

References

External links
Cal Ripken Collegiate Baseball League official website
National Alliance of College Summer Baseball official website

Team Sites
Alexandria Aces
Bethesda Big Train
D.C. Grays
Gaithersburg Giants
Herndon Braves
Olney Cropdusters
Silver Spring-Takoma Thunderbolts

College baseball leagues in the United States
Baseball leagues in Maryland
Baseball in Washington, D.C.
Summer baseball leagues
Sports leagues established in 2005
2005 establishments in the United States